Hussain Sifaau Yoosuf (born 4 February 1996), is a Maldivian footballer currently playing as a defender for Club Eagles.

Career statistics

International

International goals
Scores and results list the Maldives' goal tally first.

Honours

Maldives
SAFF Championship: 2018

References

1996 births
Living people
Maldivian footballers
Maldives international footballers
Association football defenders